This is a list of the highest known prices paid for paintings. The current record price is approximately US$450.3 million (which includes commission), paid for Leonardo da Vinci's Salvator Mundi. The painting was sold in November 2017, through the auction house Christie's in New York City.

Background
The most famous paintings, especially old master works created before 1803, are generally owned or held at museums, for viewing by patrons. Since the museums rarely sell them, they are considered priceless. Guinness World Records lists Leonardo da Vinci's Mona Lisa as having the highest ever insurance value for a painting. On permanent display at the Louvre in Paris, the Mona Lisa was assessed at US$100 million on 14 December 1962.

The earliest sale on the list below (Vase with Fifteen Sunflowers by Vincent van Gogh) is from March 1987; with a price of £24.75 million (£ million in  currency). This sale tripled the previous record, and introduced a new era in top art sales. Before this, the highest absolute price paid for a painting was £8.1 million (£ million in  currency) paid by the J. Paul Getty Museum for Andrea Mantegna's Adoration of the Magi at Christie's in London on 18 April 1985. In constant dollars, the highest price paid before 1987 was by the National Gallery of Art when in February 1967 they acquired Leonardo da Vinci's Ginevra de' Benci for around $5 million ($ million in  dollars) from the Princely Family of Liechtenstein. The sale of Vincent van Gogh's Sunflowers was the first time a "modern" (in this case 1888) painting became the record holder, as opposed to the old master paintings which previously had dominated the market. In contrast, there are currently only nine pre-1875 paintings among the listed top 89, and none created between 1635 and 1874.

An exceptional case is graffiti artist David Choe, who accepted payment in shares for painting graffiti art in the headquarters of a fledgling Facebook. His shares were of limited value when he was given them, but by the time of Facebook's IPO they were valued at around $200 million.

The list is incomplete with respect to sales between private parties, as these are not always reported and, even if they are, details like the purchase price may remain secret. For example, on June 25, 2019, the American hedge fund manager J. Tomilson Hill bought a recently rediscovered Judith and Holofernes (1607) attributed to Caravaggio, two days before it would have been auctioned in Toulouse. Though the Louvre Museum had turned down the opportunity to purchase it for €100 million, the painting was estimated to sell for $110 to $170 million. The actual purchase price was not disclosed, because of a confidentiality agreement attached to the private sale. Another example is a 2019 sale of The Seated Zouave by Vincent van Gogh. According to some sources, the painting had been sold by Argentinian art collector Nelly Arrieta de Blaquier for $300 million, but the price was not confirmed by any of the parties involved.

Vincent van Gogh, Pablo Picasso, and Andy Warhol are the best-represented artists in the list. Prices realised for just his nine paintings listed below, when adjusted for inflation to 2017, add up to over US$900 million.

Georgia O'Keeffe holds the record for the highest price paid for a painting by a woman. On November 20, 2014 at Sotheby's, the Crystal Bridges Museum of American Art bought her 1932 painting Jimson Weed/White Flower No. 1 for US$44.4 million (equivalent to US$ million in ).

Among the listed top 89, only six are paintings by non-Western artists. Five are traditional Chinese paintings by Qi Baishi, Wu Bin, Wang Meng and Xu Yang. In particular, Qi Baishi's Twelve Landscape Screens was sold for $140.8 million in 2017. The only non-Western modern artwork listed is that of the Chinese-French painter Zao Wouki's oil painting Juin-Octobre 1985, which was sold for $65 million in 2018. Not listed here in this list is Chinese painter Wang Shaofei's The High Sun, which was appraised for $74 million in 2017.

List of highest prices paid 

Where necessary, the price is first converted to dollars using the exchange rate at the time the painting was sold. The inflation adjustment may change as recent inflation rates are often revised. A list in another currency may be in a slightly different order due to exchange-rate fluctuations. Paintings are listed only once, i.e. for the highest price sold.

Interactive graph

See also

 Market for artworks
 List of most expensive artworks by living artists
 Destination painting
 List of most expensive sculptures
 List of most expensive photographs
 List of most expensive non-fungible tokens
 List of most expensive books and manuscripts
 The Price of Everything, 2018 documentary on contemporary art valuations
 The Lost Leonardo, 2021 documentary on the 2017 sale of the Salvador Mundi

Notes

References

External links
 The Most Expensive Paintings ever sold list by theartwolf
 

Paintings
Lists of visual art topics
$
Auction-related lists
Paintings